Grassy Pond is a small lake north of Stillwater in Herkimer County, New York. It drains south via an unnamed creek which flows into the Middle Branch Oswegatchie River.

See also
 List of lakes in New York

References 

Lakes of New York (state)
Lakes of Herkimer County, New York